Adenocarpus foliolosus, known locally as codeso and commonly known as Canary Island flatpod is a shrubby species of flowering plant in the legume family Fabaceae, subfamily Faboideae, that is endemic to Canary Islands where it can be found in Tenerife, La Gomera, El Hierro, Gran Canaria and La Palma.

References

Genisteae
Flora of Africa
Endemic flora of the Canary Islands